Ricardo Legorreta Vilchis (May 7, 1931 – December 30, 2011) was a Mexican architect. He was a prolific designer of private houses, public buildings and master plans in Mexico, the United States of America and some other countries.

He was awarded the prestigious UIA Gold Medal in 1999, the AIA Gold Medal in 2000, and the Praemium Imperiale in 2011.

Life and career
Ricardo Legorreta was born on May 7, 1931, in Mexico City. He studied architecture at the Universidad Nacional Autónoma de México, from where he graduated in 1953. After working for ten years with José Villagrán García, he established his own office in 1963.

Architectural expression
Legorreta was a disciple of Luis Barragán and carried Barragan's ideas to a wider realm.  Barragan, in the 1940s and 1950s amalgamated tradition and the modern movement in architecture yet his work is mostly limited to domestic architecture. Legorreta applied elements of Barragan's architecture in his work including bright colors, play of light and shadow, and solid Platonic geometric shapes.  One of the important contributions of Legorreta has been the use of these elements in other building types such as hotels, factories as well as in commercial and educational buildings. His most famous works are the Camino Real Hotel in Mexico City, the IBM Factory in Guadalajara and the Cathedral of Managua.

Works

In Mexico City
 1964, Laboratorios Smith Kline & French, collaboration with Mathias Goeritz, today the Comisión de Derechos Humanos del Distrito Federal, Av. Universidad 1449
 1967, Colegio Cedros and Universidad Panamericana Preparatoria, Tecoyotitla 364 y 366, Chimalistac, San Ángel
 1967, Casa Lomas Altas
 1968, Camino Real hotel, Colonia Anzures
 1968, Offices of Celanese Mexicana, now SEMARNAT, Av. Revolución 1425, Tlacopac, San Ángel
 1972, Restoration of the Palace of Iturbide, Historic Center
 1976, Seguros América offices, today Tribunal Federal de Justicia, Av. Revolución 1508, San Ángel
 1985, Kodak factory in Xochimilco
 1993, Restoration of the Antiguo Colegio de San Ildefonso, UNAM. Justo Sierra street #16, Historic Center
 1993, Papalote Museo del Niño, Bosque de Chapultepec 2nd Section
 1994, Restoration of the Club de Banqueros, Av. 16 de Septiembre 27,  Historic Center
 1994, Remodel of the Chapultepec Zoo
 1994, Centro Nacional de las Artes master plan, Edificio de Administración e Investigación, Edificio Central and Escuela Nacional de Artes Plásticas La Esmeralda
 1998, Televisa Santa Fe
 2001, Tecnológico de Monterrey, Campus Santa Fe
 2005, Plaza Juárez including the Museum of Memory and Tolerance and Secretaría de Relaciones Exteriores (Plaza Juárez tower)
 2010, Torre BBVA Bancomer, in collaboration with Rogers Stirk Harbour + Partners of London.  Paseo de la Reforma at Lieja street.
 2010, División de Estudios de Posgrado y Especializaciones en Economía, UNAM. Centro Cultural Universitario

Other cities in Mexico
 1967, Chrysler factory in  Toluca
 1967 Nissan Cuernavaca Plant
 1970, IBM Guadalajara Technology Campus, Guadalajara
 1975, Hotel Camino Real, Cancun, now Hyatt Ziva Cancun
 1981, Hotel Camino Real, today Westin Brisas, Ixtapa
 1985, Renault factory en Gómez Palacio, Durango
 1989, Plan Maestro para Huatulco, Huatulco
 1990, Hotel Las Brisas, Huatulco
 1991, Museo de Arte Contemporáneo de Monterrey
 2001, EGADE Escuela de Graduados en Administración y Dirección de Empresas del ITESM in Monterrey
 2007, EGAP Escuela de Graduados en Administración Pública y Política Pública del ITESM in Monterrey
 2007, Hotel La Purificadora, 2006 Puebla City
 2007, Hotel Casa Reyna, Privada 2 Oriente 1007, Puebla City
 2007, Hotel Camino Real Monterrey
 2008, Museo Interactivo Laberinto de las Ciencias y las Artes, San Luis Potosí
 2008, The Tides, Playa del Carmen Riviera Maya
 2011, Centro Médico Zambrano Hellion of the ITESM in Monterrey

United States of America
 1983–1985, Casa Montalbán, in Los Angeles
 1985, buildings at Solana Complex in Southlake near Dallas
 1988, Tustin Market Place, Tustin, California
 1990, Children's Discovery Museum of San Jose 
 1994, Pershing Square restoration, Los Angeles
 1995, San Antonio Public Library
 1995, South Chula Vista branch library, Chula Vista, San Diego, California
 1998, Novartis Institutes for BioMedical Research building, Emeryville, California
 1998, The Tech Museum of Innovation, San Jose
 1998, The UCLA Tom Bradley International Hall Gallery and Conference Center, Los Angeles
 1999, Santa Fe University of Art and Design Visual Arts Center, 1999, Santa Fe
 2001, Max Palevsky Residential Commons (Chicago)
 2003, Latino Cultural Center Dallas
 2003, Keller Estate Winery, Petaluma, California
 2005, Bakar Fitness & Recreation Center at UCSF Mission Bay, San Francisco
 2015, Cross Border Xpress terminal and bridge in Otay Mesa, San Diego, connecting to Tijuana International Airport

Central America

 
 1993, Metropolitan Cathedral of the Immaculate Conception, (Managua, Nicaragua)
 2004, Multiplaza Panamericana (San Salvador, El Salvador)
 2005, Centro Comercial Multiplaza Panamericana, in Antiguo Cuscatlan, El Salvador
 2005, New campus of the Escuela Superior de Economía y Negocios, ESEN, Santa Tecla, El Salvador
 2007–2009, Casa Margarita, Guatemala City
 2012–2014, Terra Esperanza,  Guatemala City

Other countries
 2000, Mexico pavilion at Expo 2000 Hannover
 2003, Fashion and Textile Museum, (Bermondsey, London, United Kingdom)
 2004, Houses in Las Águilas, Madrid, Spain
 2005, Hotel Sheraton Bilbao, Bilbao, Spain
 2007, Texas A&M University at Qatar, (Education City, Doha, Qatar)
 2008, Carnegie Mellon University (Qatar), (Education City, Doha, Qatar)
 2008, Campus Center and Student Residential Village, the American University in Cairo, Cairo)
 2009, Casa Del Agua Hotel, 2009 (Jeju-do, South Korea)
 2010, Davidka Square, 2010 (Jerusalem, Israel)

Other Recognition
In 2000, Legoretta received the Golden Plate Award of the American Academy of Achievement.

In 2002, Legoretta received the Order of Isabella the Catholic granted by the government of Spain.

References

Further reading

External links

 Official Legorreta a Legorreta website
 

 01
Modernist architects from Mexico
Postmodern architects
Architecture firms of Mexico
1931 births
2011 deaths
Architects from Mexico City
Recipients of the Praemium Imperiale
National Autonomous University of Mexico alumni
Postmodern architecture in Mexico
20th-century Mexican architects
21st-century Mexican architects
Recipients of the AIA Gold Medal